Michael Muir Jaffe (born January 9, 1945) is an American TV and film producer. He started out in the business with his father, producer and former AFTRA lawyer Henry Jaffe (1907–1992).  His mother was actress Jean Muir. He has more than 120 producing credits but ventured into writing and directing only for the A&E television series A Nero Wolfe Mystery (2001–02), which he called "the love of my life."

He is a founding partner of Jaffe/Braunstein Films, which became Jaffe/Braunstein Entertainment in 2007, when ITV bought a controlling share of 51% in the company.	

Jaffe holds a BA from Yankton College and an MA in Theater from Cornell University.

Filmography

Producer
Michael Jaffe is credited as executive producer unless noted.

Writer

Director

Awards
 2005, Winner, Christopher AwardThe Brooke Ellison Story
 2005, Nominee, Primetime Emmy AwardElvisOutstanding Miniseries
 2008, Nominee, Primetime Emmy AwardThe Memory Keeper's DaughterOutstanding Made-for-Television Movie

References

External links

1945 births
Television producers from New York City
Film producers from New York (state)
Nero Wolfe
Living people
Businesspeople from New York City
Yankton College alumni
Cornell University alumni